Milton Cairoli (born 12 June 1933) is a Uruguayan lawyer and former judge.

From 1993 to 2003 he was a member of the Supreme Court of Justice, presiding over it in 1997 and 2001.

Publications
 Reflexiones sobre la Ley de Seguridad Ciudadana (with Ricardo Pérez Manrique)

References

1933 births
Living people
People from Montevideo
20th-century Uruguayan judges
21st-century Uruguayan judges
Supreme Court of Uruguay justices
Academic staff of the University of the Republic (Uruguay)
Scholars of criminal law